Madhurima Tuli (born 19 August 1986) is an Indian actress and model. Her works in Hindi television include the fiction dramas Kasturi, Parichay, Kumkum Bhagya, Chandrakanta and Qayamat Ki Raat and the reality shows Nach Baliye 9 and Bigg Boss 13. She also starred in big Hindi films such as Baby (2015), Hamari Adhuri Kahani (2015) and Naam Shabana (2017).

Early life
Tuli was born in Odisha on 19 August 1986. She hails from Dehradun, Uttarakhand. She won the Miss Uttraranchal Contest when in college. Her father works for Tata Steel, her mother works for an NGO, and she has a younger brother Shrikant Tuli. who owns a Music Label SVMT Music.

Career
Tuli made an early debut in the Telugu film Saththaa (2004) opposite Sai Kiran. She moved to Mumbai and studied acting at the Kishore Namit Kapoor Acting School, worked as a model doing advertisements for brands like Godrej, Fiama Di Wills, Airtel, Lenovo, UltraTech Cement, Domino's Pizza and Karbonn Mobiles.

In 2008, she played a supporting role as the pretty girl Satya in Homam, an Indian thriller written and directed by J. D. Chakravarthy, and to some extent inspired by the 2006 Hollywood movie The Departed, directed by Martin Scorsese.

Toss (2009) was her next film in the role of Sherry, and after the small role as Bindiya in Zee TV's supernatural soap opera Shree (2008-2009), Tuli played the aspiring model Kushi in STAR One's TV series Rang Badalti Odhani (2010-2011).

Tuli had a lead as newly married Rukmini in Kaalo (2010). It was screened at the 6th Annual South African Halloween Horror Festival in Cape Town, where it won the best feature film and best cinematography award. Together with Dino Morea as her partner, she took part in the third season of Fear Factor: Khatron Ke Khiladi, a reality show filmed in Brazil and broadcast by Aapka Colors

Tuli had a leading role in Cigarette Ki Tarah (2012) along with Prashant Narayanan, and as the female lead Natasha in Anik Singal's English language short film Lethal Commission (2012).

She starred in the film Maaricha (2012), directed by K. Sivasurya. The film was simultaneously made in Kannada and Tamil and had Mithun Tejasvi playing the lead actor opposite Tuli.

Tuli played Gunjan Dutta in the Hindi thriller 3D film Warning (2013). She was seen playing the lead role in the film Nimbe Huli, directed by Hemanth Hegde and produced by Subhash Ghai. The film had Hegde playing the lead role along with Tuli, Komal Jha and Nivedhitha. She also played the role of Anjali Singh Rajput (wife of Akshay Kumar) in the 2015 action film Baby. Tuli participated in Zee TV's reality show I Can Do That. She also played the antagonist role of Tanu in Kumkum Bhagya on Zee TV. Later she reprised her role of Anjali Singh Rajput in Naam Shabana—a spin-off of Baby (2015)—with Akshay Kumar, Anupam Kher, Taapsee Pannu, and Manoj Bajpayee. Her first Hollywood venture came in 2017 where she played the younger version of Shabana Azmi (Maharaja Duleep Singh's mother) in the film The Black Prince, which is based on the last king of the Sikh Empire Maharaja Duleep.

She then portrayed Princess Chandrakanta in Colors TV series Chandrakanta.

Personal life
Tuli met actor Vishal Aditya Singh on the sets of her show Chandrakanta in 2017 and later dated him. They broke up after a year of dating in 2018.

Filmography

Films

Television

Web series

Music videos

Theatres

See also
List of Hindi television actresses
List of Indian film actresses
List of Indian television actresses

References

External links 

 
 

1986 births
Living people
Actresses in Hindi cinema
Actresses in Hindi television
Actresses in Kannada cinema
Indian film actresses
Actresses in Tamil cinema
Actresses from Uttarakhand
People from Odisha
21st-century Indian actresses
Actresses in Telugu cinema
Indian television actresses
Fear Factor: Khatron Ke Khiladi participants